Melanie Slowing de Montenegro (born January 10, 1973) is a Guatemalan former swimmer, who specialized in sprint freestyle events. Slowing qualified for the women's 50 m freestyle, as a 31-year-old, at the 2004 Summer Olympics in Athens, by breaking a Guatemalan record and posting a FINA B-cut of 26.89 from the Central American and Caribbean Championships in Mexico City. She topped the fourth heat by less than 0.04 of a second ahead of Moldova's Maria Tregubova in 27.44. Slowing failed to advance into the semifinals, as she placed forty-sixth overall out of 75 swimmers on the last day of preliminaries.

She is the sister of Karen Slowing who competed in the Olympics in 1984.

References

External links
 Profile – Aquatics Centre Guatemala 

1973 births
Living people
Guatemalan female swimmers
Olympic swimmers of Guatemala
Swimmers at the 2004 Summer Olympics
Guatemalan female freestyle swimmers
Sportspeople from Guatemala City